The 1990 Dwars door België was the 45th edition of the Dwars door Vlaanderen cycle race and was held on 22 March 1990. The race started and finished in Waregem. The race was won by Edwig Van Hooydonck.

General classification

References

1990
1990 in road cycling
1990 in Belgian sport
March 1990 sports events in Europe